Plata may refer to:

 Joao Plata (born 1992), an Ecuadorian football player
 Juan Carlos Plata (born 1971), a Guatemalan retired football player
 Plata, Texas, an unincorporated community in Presidio County, Texas, United States
 La Plata, the capital city of the Province of Buenos Aires, Argentina
 Plata, Aibonito, Puerto Rico, a barrio
 Plata, Lajas, Puerto Rico, a barrio
 Plata, Moca, Puerto Rico, a barrio
 a type of tequila